Anat Baron may refer to:

Anat Baron (director), director and producer
Anat Baron (judge), Judge at the Supreme Court of Israel